Veeramachaneni Jagapathi Chowdary (born 12 February 1962), professionally known as Jagapathi Babu, is an Indian actor known for his works predominantly in Telugu cinema. He has also appeared in a few Tamil, Kannada and Malayalam films. In a career spanning 33 years, Babu has appeared in 170 feature films, and has received four Filmfare Awards and seven state Nandi Awards.

He has worked with noted directors like Kodi Ramakrishna, S. V. Krishna Reddy, Ram Gopal Varma, Krishna Vamsi, E. V. V. Satyanarayana, Gunasekhar, Chandra Sekhar Yeleti, A. M. Rathnam, K. Raghavendra Rao, Radha Mohan, Mohan Raja, J. D. Chakravarthy, Boyapati Srinu, and Sukumar.

Early life 
Jagapathi Babu was born on 12 February 1962 in Machilipatnam to veteran producer-director V. B. Rajendra Prasad. He was brought up in Chennai, Tamil Nadu before making a mark in Telugu cinema. He married Lakshmi and has two daughters.

Career

1989–2013: Lead roles 

Babu made his debut in Telugu with the movie Simha Swapnam (1989) which was produced by his father and directed by V. Madhusudhana Rao. That same year, he starred in Adavilo Abhimanyudu. His first commercial success came with Peddarikam released in 1992. He had his breakthrough in the form of Gaayam directed by Ram Gopal Varma in the year 1993. In 1994, with the super hit film Subhalagnam, he reached family audience and also established his star status. He won the Nandi Award for Best Actor in 1996 for his role in the movie Maavichiguru directed by S V Krishna Reddy.

1997 saw runway hit films like Subhakankshalu and Pelli Pandiri. In 1998, he won the Nandi Award for Best Supporting Actor for the film Anthahpuram. In 2000, he won the Nandi Best Actor Award for his performance in the thriller Manoharam. In 2003–05, he did runway hit films like Kabaddi Kabaddi, Athade Oka Sainyam, Pedababu and Anukokunda Oka Roju. In 2006, he appeared in Samanyudu and Pellaina Kothalo. He received the Nandi Best Supporting Actor Award for the second time in the year 2007 for his role in the film Lakshyam in addition to a won Filmfare Award. In 2011, he received the Kala Bhushana Award for his contribution to cinema by TSR Lalitha Kala Parishat.

His first Tamil movie was Madrasi, and in 2012, he appeared as the antagonist in Tamil film Thaandavam. Subsequently, he played the lead role in Jai Bolo Telangana, which won five Nandi Awards. In 2012, he debuted in the Kannada film Bachchan as a cop.

2014–present: Supporting roles 

Since 2014, Babu took a complete turn-around in his choice of roles, in what he terms a "second-innings." Babu, who until then was a lead actor, decided to play antagonistic and supporting roles to maintain his career graph. The first of which is the Nandamuri Balakrishna-starrer Legend (2014), where played an antagonist for the first time. His performance as Jitendra, a ruthless don was hugely praised and also won many accolades. In the same year, he played a negative role opposite Rajinikanth in Lingaa. In 2015, he played Mahesh Babu's father in Srimanthudu. In 2016, Babu played a London-based billionaire in Sukumar-directed Nannaku Prematho starring Jr NTR was also appreciated. He played antagonist in Ism and Jaguar. He also played opposite Mohanlal in Malayalam film, Pulimurugan. In 2017, he played Naga Chaitanya's father in Rarandoi Veduka Chudham.

In 2018, Rangasthalam, also directed by Sukumar, Babu played an oppressive president of the eponymous village. Grossing more than 2 billion, Rangasthalam was the highest grossing Telugu of that year. Alongside this, he played a Bangladeshi-terrorist in Goodachari, which became a sleeper hit. His role Trivikram Srinivas-directed Aravinda Sametha Veera Raghava (2018) is termed as one of finest performances of his career. In 2019, His notable works were Maharshi along with a crucial role in Sye Raa Narasimha Reddy.

Filmography

Awards and nominations

Filmfare Awards

Nandi Awards

SIIMA Awards

IIFA Utsavam

Asianet Film Awards

References

External links 

 

Living people
1962 births
Telugu people
Male actors in Telugu cinema
Male actors in Tamil cinema
Male actors in Kannada cinema
Male actors in Malayalam cinema
Indian male film actors
20th-century Indian male actors
21st-century Indian male actors
Indian television presenters
Filmfare Awards South winners
Nandi Award winners
Male actors from Andhra Pradesh
People from Krishna district
People from Machilipatnam